Series Three of Ninja Warrior UK, a British physical obstacle assault course game show, was aired on ITV from 31 December 2016 to 18 February 2017. Of the 250 contestant who took part, this series' competition was won by Jonny Urszuly. During its broadcast, the series averaged around 3.81 million viewers.

Series Overview

Qualifier
In the course of the five qualifier rounds, the contestants faced a variety of different obstacles in each round, alongside Quintuple Steps and Warped Wall. The most common featured included Jump Hang - this series saw a few new variations on the obstacle - Floating Tiles, and Log Runner - this obstacle was new for this series. This series saw the introduction of new obstacles used on the course - Silk Drop, Beam Cross, Pipe Climber, and Log Grip - as well as the use of UFO, Swing Circle, Swinging Frames, Double Tilt Ladder, Pole Rider, and Silk Slider.

Qualifier 1 Results

Qualifier 2 Results

Qualifier 3 Results

Qualifier 4 Results

Qualifier 5 Results

Semi-finals

For the top 50 go to 9 obstacles on 2 Semi-Finals. The Stage 1 is Quintuple Steps, Ring Swing, Spinning Log, Jump Hang With Trumpette, Ring Slider, and Warped Wall. Complete the Stage 1 within 3 minutes, go to Stage 2 on: Big Dipper, Pole Grapser, and Chimney Climb. And the end 2 Semi-Finals, top 15 fastest go to Final.

Semi-Finals Results

Final
For the finals of this series, all three stages of obstacles were conducted. Stage 1 required the finalists to complete 9 obstacles - Quadruple Steps, Rolling Log, Coin Flip, Ring Jump, Wind Chimes, Warped Wall, Big Dipper With Tassels, Three Logs, and Chimney Climb - within 6 minutes. Of the finalists that took on this stage, only 6 successfully completed it: Jacob Peregrine – Wheller, Ali Hay, Fred Dorrington, Bruce Winfield, Cain Clarke, and Jonny Urszuly.

Stage 2 required the remaining finalists to take on 5 obstacles - Spider Jump, Spin Cycle, Salmon Ladder, Monkey Pegs, and Wall Lift - and complete them within 2 minutes. Of the remaining finalists, only Clarke and Urszuly managed to complete it successfully.

For Stage 3, the remaining two finalists had to complete 3 obstacles, but with no time limit - Crazy Cliff Hanger, Floating Boards, and Flying Bars. Neither contestant managed to complete the stage, thus the winner was determined by progress, resulting in Urszuly being declared the winner.

Ratings

References

2016 British television seasons
2017 British television seasons
Ninja Warrior UK